The Statute Law Revision Act 1927 (17 & 18 Geo 5 c 42) was an Act of the Parliament of the United Kingdom.

The enactments which were repealed (whether for the whole or any part of the United Kingdom) by this Act were repealed so far as they extended to the Isle of Man on 25 July 1991.

Section 2
The words "to the court of the county palatine of Lancaster or" in this section were repealed by section 56(4) of, and Part II of Schedule 11 to, the Courts Act 1971. This section was repealed by section 32(4) of, and Part V of Schedule 5 to, the Administration of Justice Act 1977.

Section 4 - Short title and extent
Section 4(2) was repealed by section 41(1) of, and Part I of Schedule 6 to, the Northern Ireland Constitution Act 1973.

Schedule
Part I of the Schedule to this Act was repealed by section 1 of, and Schedule 1 to, the Statute Law Revision Act 1950.

See also
Statute Law Revision Act

References
Halsbury's Statutes,
HL Deb vol 68, cols 663 and 664 and 863 to 864, vol 69, cols 59, 60, 152, 230, 306 and 1266, HC Deb vol 211 cols 1388 and 2698, vol 212, col 533.

External links

United Kingdom Acts of Parliament 1927